China National Highway 322 (G322) runs from Hengyang, Hunan to Friendship pass, Guangxi. It is 1039 kilometres in length and runs southwest from Hengyang towards Friendship pass, which is on the China-Vietnam border.

Route and distance

See also
 China National Highways
 AH1

External links
Official website of Ministry of Transport of PRC

322
Transport in Guangxi
Transport in Hunan